Viauville is a neighbourhood in the borough of Mercier–Hochelaga-Maisonneuve located in Montreal, Quebec, Canada. Established in 1892 as a result of an urban plan made by Charles-Théodore Viau and the former city of Maisonneuve, and part of the aforementioned city, Viauville never obtained municipality status.

Viauville is named for  Charles-Théodore Viau, a member of the paroisse Saint-Clément and founder of the biscuiterie Viau.

The area was home to Canadian Vickers Maisonville Shipyards, now Port of Montreal berths.

Important dates
1867 - Foundation of the biscuiterie Viau
1898 - Opening of the registers of the paroisse Saint-Clément.
1899 - Inauguration of Saint-Clément Church.
Culinar acquires biscuiterie Viau.
Culinar sells biscuiterie Viau to Saputo Incorporated.
2001 - Saputo sells biscuiterie Viau to Dare Foods
2003 - Closure of the biscuiterie Viau.

References

Neighbourhoods in Montreal
Mercier–Hochelaga-Maisonneuve
Quebec populated places on the Saint Lawrence River